Boluran (also Romanized as Bolūrān) is a village in Boluran Rural District, Iran. 

This village is located 35 km west of Kuhdasht.

Demographics
As of the 2016 census, its population was 742 (379 men and 363 women), in 217 families. It is the largest village in Boluran Rural District by population. Its residents speak Laki and the predominant religion is Yarsanism.

Gallery

Boluran Forest Park
Boluran Forest Park is a park in Kuhdasht.  The park suffered extensive forest fire damage. In 2016, a large fire raged for days, damaging hundreds of acres of land.

References 

Kurdish settlements in Iran
Towns and villages in Kuhdasht County